"A Looking in View" is a song by American rock band Alice in Chains, featured on their fourth studio album, Black Gives Way to Blue (2009). It was the first publicly released song from the album and was available for purchase on June 30, 2009, and for a limited time it was available as a free download through the official Alice in Chains website. Although it was not the album's first official single, Rock stations across the U.S. started playing the song after it was made available for streaming. The first official radio single, "Check My Brain", was released in August 2009.

"A Looking in View" was Alice in Chains' first release with new vocalist William DuVall, who replaced the band's original singer, Layne Staley, in 2006. Vocalist/guitarist Jerry Cantrell shares lead vocals with DuVall. The song was the band's first release since 1999's "Fear the Voices". Clocking in at a length of seven minutes and six seconds, it is the second longest song Alice in Chains has released as a single (official or non-official), behind the MTV Unplugged version of "Over Now", as well as their fourth longest song to date, behind "Frogs" from their self-titled 1995 album, "All I Am" from their 2018 album Rainier Fog, and "Phantom Limb" from their 2013 album The Devil Put Dinosaurs Here. The song peaked at No. 12 on Billboard's Mainstream Rock chart, at No. 38 on the Alternative Songs chart, and at No. 27 on the Hot Rock Songs chart.

"A Looking in View" was nominated for a Grammy Award for Best Hard Rock Performance in 2011.

Lyrics
Guitarist and vocalist Jerry Cantrell said of the song in the press release:

Release and reception
On June 30, 2009, "A Looking in View" was made available for purchase via iTunes and Amazon, and for a limited time it was available as a free download through the official Alice in Chains website in early July. Although it wasn't the album's first radio single, Rock stations across the U.S. started playing the song. As of mid-August 2009, it has peaked at number 12 on the Billboard Hot Mainstream Rock Tracks chart, at number 38 on the Billboard Alternative Songs chart, and at number 27 on the Billboard Hot Rock Songs chart.

The song was nominated in the 53rd Grammy Awards Ceremony in the category of "Best Hard Rock Performance".

In popular culture
The song was released as downloadable content for the Rock Band and Rock Band 2 music video games for the Xbox 360, Wii, and PlayStation 3 consoles, as part of Alice In Chains Pack 01, which also includes older hits "Rooster", "Would?", and "No Excuses", along with "Check My Brain", also from Black Gives Way to Blue. It was added to the Xbox Live Marketplace and in-game Music Store for the Wii on September 29, 2009, and it was added to the PlayStation Network on October 1, 2009.

Music video
The music video for "A Looking in View" was directed by Stephen Schuster. Shooting wrapped on June 20, 2009 and the video premiered on Alice in Chains official website on July 7, 2009. It was Alice in Chains' first music video since 1999's "Get Born Again", and the first music video since 1994's "I Stay Away" that does not feature the band. It features actors Sacha Senisch, Chad Post and Devin Zephyr instead.

At the 6:55 mark of the video, a woman (played by Sacha Senisch) is seen lying on a cracked desert floor similarly to the cover art of Alice in Chains' 1992 album Dirt.

Schuster explained the music video to VideoStatic:

Personnel
Jerry Cantrell – lead vocals, lead guitar
William DuVall – co-lead vocals, rhythm guitar
Mike Inez – bass
Sean Kinney – drums

Chart positions

References

External links

"A Looking in View" Uncensored music video on Vevo

2009 singles
2008 songs
Alice in Chains songs
Songs written by Jerry Cantrell
Songs written by Mike Inez
Songs written by Sean Kinney
Songs written by William DuVall
Song recordings produced by Nick Raskulinecz
Virgin Records singles
EMI Records singles
American hard rock songs